The premier of New Brunswick (French (masculine): premier ministre du Nouveau-Brunswick, or feminine: première ministre du Nouveau-Brunswick) is the first minister and head of government for the Canadian province of New Brunswick.

The premier of a Canadian province is much like the prime minister of Canada. They are normally the leader of the party or coalition with the most seats in the Legislative Assembly of New Brunswick. The premier is styled Honourable but is not a member of the privy council so this title is only for the duration of their term of office. Prior the establishment of the office, the Government leaders prior to responsible government was the chief political position in New Brunswick.

The premier is chosen by the lieutenant governor of New Brunswick.

The province of New Brunswick, since being established in 1785, has had a variety of leaders. Since the 1840s responsible government has been in place and the position of premier has been formalized.

The current premier of New Brunswick is Blaine Higgs, who was sworn in November 9, 2018.

List

References

External links
Office of the Premier

See also
 List of premiers of New Brunswick

 
Politics of New Brunswick